John Burton Mustin (born January 24, 1967) is a United States Navy vice admiral who currently serves as the 15th Chief of Navy Reserve since August 7, 2020. He previously served as the Vice Commander of the United States Fleet Forces Command.

Born into a family with a long history of naval service, Mustin graduated from the United States Naval Academy in 1990 with a B.S. degree in weapons and systems engineering. He was born in San Diego County, California and raised in Alexandria, Virginia, graduating from St. Stephen's School in 1985. Mustin later earned an M.S. degree in operations research from the Naval Postgraduate School and an M.B.A. degree from Babson College.

Awards and decorations

References

External links

1967 births
Living people
People from San Diego County, California
Mustin family
People from Alexandria, Virginia
United States Naval Academy alumni
Naval Postgraduate School alumni
Babson College alumni
United States Navy admirals